Mullah Abdul Latif Hakimi, (also known as Latif Hakimi or Hakim Latifi) was a media spokesman for the Taliban between January 2004 until his capture in October 2005 by Pakistani officials.

Life
Hakimi first claimed a suicide bombing on 28 January 2004, that killed a British soldier in Kabul, Afghanistan.
 
In June 2005, he confirmed that a helicopter had been shot down by insurgent fire during Operation Red Wings, killing all 16 U.S. Naval special operators aboard, representing the largest loss of life in the Invasion for the Coalition forces at that time.

On 4 October 2005, Pakistani officials arrested Hakimi in Balochistan, Pakistan. After Hakimi's capture, Yousef Ahmadi represented the Taliban, along with Muhammad Hanif.

Hakimi was released on 18 March 2007 along with four other Taliban prisoners in exchange for the release of kidnapped Italian reporter Daniele Mastrogiacomo. Daniele was freed a day later but Daniele's driver Sayed Agha was beheaded days before after the Taliban claimed he was a spy. Daniele's translator Ajmal Naqshbandi was beheaded on 8 April 2007.

See also 
Zabiullah Mujahid

References

Taliban spokespersons
Living people
Afghan expatriates in Pakistan
Year of birth missing (living people)